Gennaro Di Napoli (born 5 March 1968) is an Italian former middle distance runner.

He won 13 medals at the International athletics competitions, 10 of these at senior level.

Biography
Di Napoli was born in Naples but moved early in his life to Lombardy, in northern Italy. He excelled in the distances from 800 to 3,000 meters. He won the silver medal at the European Championships in Split 1990 over 1500 metres. He missed out on a medal at the World Championships 1991.

In 1992 Di Napoli scored a sensational victory over the world champion Noureddine Morceli from Algeria at the Golden Gala meeting in Rome. However, he got injured two weeks before the Barcelona Olympic Games in 1992, where he participated, but failed to reach the final. In 1993 di Napoli won the 3,000 m Indoor World Championships' gold medal; a title which he defended at the 1995 Indoor Championships. However, his achievements in outdoor races remained mixed.

Achievements

National titles
Gennaro Di Napoli has won 8 times the individual national championship.
3 wins in the 1500 metres (1990, 1991, 1992)
1 win in the 5000 metres (2000)
1 win in the cross country running (1996)
3 wins in the 3000 metres indoor (1997, 1999, 2000)

See also
 Italian all-time lists - 1500 metres
 Italian all-time lists - 5000 metres

References

External links
 

1968 births
Living people
Italian male cross country runners
Italian male middle-distance runners
Italian male long-distance runners
Athletes (track and field) at the 1988 Summer Olympics
Athletes (track and field) at the 1992 Summer Olympics
Athletes (track and field) at the 1996 Summer Olympics
Olympic athletes of Italy
Athletes from Naples
Athletics competitors of Fiamme Oro
European Athletics Championships medalists
European athletics champions for Italy
Mediterranean Games gold medalists for Italy
Athletes (track and field) at the 1991 Mediterranean Games
World Athletics Championships athletes for Italy
Mediterranean Games medalists in athletics
World Athletics Indoor Championships winners